Billy Milano is an American heavy metal and hardcore punk musician. He is the singer and occasionally guitarist and bassist of crossover thrash band M.O.D., and was the singer of its predecessor, Stormtroopers of Death. Prior to these bands, Milano played in early New York hardcore band the Psychos, which also launched the career of future Agnostic Front vocalist Roger Miret. Milano was also the singer of United Forces, which included his Stormtroopers of Death bandmate Dan Lilker. Milano managed a number of bands, including Agnostic Front, for whom he also co-produced the 1997 Epitaph Records release Something's Gotta Give.

Discography

Stormtroopers of Death albums

Stormtroopers of Death videos

Method of Destruction (M.O.D.)

Mastery

References

External links
 Official website

Living people
People from the Bronx
American heavy metal bass guitarists
American heavy metal guitarists
American heavy metal singers
1964 births
Guitarists from Texas
American male bass guitarists
20th-century American bass guitarists
20th-century American male musicians
Stormtroopers of Death members
M.O.D. members
American people of Italian descent